Dzmitry Meliakh (born July 2, 1979 in Minsk) is a three-time Olympic modern pentathlete from Belarus. He first competed at the 2004 Summer Olympics in Athens, and achieved his best result in the men's event, with a score of 5,340 points, finishing in fifth place.

Following his best result, he also won the gold medal at the 2006 UIPM World Cup no. 2 in Millfield, England, and bronze medals at the European Senior Championships Olympic Qualification in Riga, Latvia in the team relay event, and the 2006 UIPM World Cup no. 5 in Cairo, Egypt for the individual senior division. Meliakh's outstanding achievements guaranteed his places at the 2008 Summer Olympics in Beijing, where he finished in only twelfth place.

Meliakh competed at his third Olympic games in London, where he had a poor performance in the horse-riding and combined running and shooting segments the men's event, finishing abruptly in thirtieth position with a score of 5,380 points.

References

External links
 

1979 births
Living people
Belarusian male modern pentathletes
Olympic modern pentathletes of Belarus
Modern pentathletes at the 2004 Summer Olympics
Modern pentathletes at the 2008 Summer Olympics
Modern pentathletes at the 2012 Summer Olympics
Sportspeople from Minsk
World Modern Pentathlon Championships medalists